Anatoli Nikolayevich Yakushev (born 9 August 1980) is a former Russian professional footballer.

Club career
He played in the Russian Football National League for FC Dynamo-SPb St. Petersburg in 2002.

Honours
 Lithuanian A Lyga runner-up: 2000.

References

External links
 

1980 births
People from Lukhovitsky District
Living people
Russian footballers
Association football midfielders
FK Žalgiris players
FC Mika players
FC Dynamo Saint Petersburg players
FC Lukhovitsy players
A Lyga players
Armenian Premier League players
Russian expatriate footballers
Expatriate footballers in Lithuania
Expatriate footballers in Armenia
Sportspeople from Moscow Oblast